Aurifilum is a monotypic genus of fungi within the family Cryphonectriaceae containing the sole species Aurifilum marmelostoma.

External links

Diaporthales
Monotypic fungi genera